Puglianello is a comune (municipality) in the Province of Benevento in the Italian region Campania, located about 45 km northeast of Naples and about 30 km northwest of Benevento.

Puglianello borders the following municipalities: Amorosi, Faicchio, Ruviano, San Salvatore Telesino.

References

Cities and towns in Campania